Rodolfo Rodríguez Mojica (born 27 February 1980) is a retired Costa Rican professional football defensive midfielder.

Club career
He began his professional career with Deportivo Saprissa and played for other national clubs, Norwegian First Division side FK Haugesund and Chinese club Tianjin Teda.

In August 2011, he left second division side Orión for reasons unknown, later joining Salvadoran giants FAS. He returned to Costa Rica in summer 2012 to play for Santos de Guápiles. In November 2013 he was dismissed by Pérez Zeledón.

In January 2014 he joined second division AS Puma Generaleña, with whom he won promotion to the top tier.

International career
Rodríguez has made nine appearances for the senior Costa Rica national football team, his debut coming in a friendly against Trinidad & Tobago on February 4, 2007. He appeared in three matches as Costa Rica won the UNCAF Nations Cup 2007 tournament and one match at the 2007 CONCACAF Gold Cup.

Rodríguez played for Costa Rica at the 1997 FIFA U-17 World Cup in Egypt.

References

External links
 
 Player profile - Nacion.com
 Profile - El Gráfico 

1980 births
Living people
People from San José Province
Association football midfielders
Costa Rican footballers
Costa Rica international footballers
2007 UNCAF Nations Cup players
2007 CONCACAF Gold Cup players
Liga FPD players
Deportivo Saprissa players
Municipal Liberia footballers
Brujas FC players
FK Haugesund players
Tianjin Jinmen Tiger F.C. players
Chinese Super League players
C.D. FAS footballers
Santos de Guápiles footballers
Municipal Pérez Zeledón footballers
Costa Rican expatriate footballers
Costa Rican expatriate sportspeople in China
Expatriate footballers in Norway
Expatriate footballers in China
Expatriate footballers in El Salvador
Copa Centroamericana-winning players